The 1927 Clemson Tigers football team represented Clemson College—now known as Clemson University—as a member of the Southern Conference (SoCon) during the 1927 college football season. Led by first-year head coach Josh Cody, the Tigers compiled an overall record of 5–3–1 with a mark of 2–2 in conference play, tying for eighth place in the SoCon.

Schedule

References

Clemson
Clemson Tigers football seasons
Clemson Tigers football